The white-banded wolf snake (Lycodon septentrionalis), also known as the northern large-toothed snake, is a species of colubrid snake found in Asia.

Description
The snake's snout is slightly depressed, and not spatulated. It has relatively small eyes. The rostral scale is much broader than it is deep, and is visible from above the snake. The scales between the nostrils are much shorter than the prefrontal scales. The frontal scale is slightly longer than it is broad, approximately as long as the distance from the scale to the snout, and shorter than the panetal scales. The loreal scale is small, elongated, and not entering the eye. The snake has one preocular and two postocular scales, and between 2 and 3 temporal scales. It has eight upper labial scales, with the third, fourth, and fifth entering the eye; its five lower labials are in contact with the anterior chin shields, which are longer than the posterior. It has 17 rows of scales, with the scales in the seven middle rows possessing a slight keel. Its 214 ventral scales are angulated laterally; the anal scale is entire; its 83 subcaudals are in two rows. The snake is black above and on the sides, with narrow, whitish, transverse bands. The bands form complete rings on the tail, which is dark brown on its lower surface. The snake's belly is whitish, with a few brown spots towards the rear. It can grow to a length of three feet, of which the tail consists of eight inches.

Etymology
 is Latin for "northern", from the phrase , meaning "seven plough oxen", indicating the seven stars of Ursa Major or Ursa Minor.

Distribution
The white-banded wolf snake is found in the North-east Indian regions of Darjeeling and Assam, in the Himalayan foothills and in the Khasi hills. It is also found across Myanmar, Laos, Vietnam, Thailand, and the Chinese province of Yunnan. It is also found in Bangladesh. It is possibly found in Bhutan. Although records exist from Taiwan and Japan, these are likely to be incorrectly identified specimens of Lycodon ruhstrati.

Reproduction
The white-banded wolf snake is oviparous, or egg-laying.

Notes

Further reading
 Günther,A. 1875 Second report on collections of Indian Reptiles obtained bv the British Museum. Proc. Zool. Soc. London,1875: 224–234.
 Günther, A. 1888 On a collection of reptiles from China. Ann. Mag. nat. Hist. (6) 1: 165-172
Definitions of septentrion from Dictionary.com

External links

Lycodon
Taxa named by Albert Günther
Reptiles described in 1875
Reptiles of Cambodia
Reptiles of India
Reptiles of Laos
Snakes of China
Snakes of Myanmar
Snakes of Thailand
Snakes of Vietnam